The organizations listed below constitute the Canadian Labour Congress, the national federation of trade unions:

National 
ACTRA
Association of Canadian Financial Officers (ACFO)
British Columbia Teachers' Federation
Canadian Association of Professional Employees (CAPE)
Canadian Office and Professional Employees Union
Canadian Postmasters and Assistants Association
Canadian Union of Postal Workers
Canadian Union of Public Employees
Elementary Teachers' Federation of Ontario (external website)
National Union of Public and General Employees
British Columbia Government and Service Employees' Union
Canadian Union of Brewery and General Workers
Health Science Association of Alberta
Health Science Association of British Columbia
Manitoba Government and General Employees' Union
New Brunswick Union of Public and Private Employees
Newfoundland and Labrador Association of Public and Private Employees
Ontario Public Service Employees Union
Prince Edward Island Union of Public Employees
Saskatchewan Government and General Employees Union
National Union of the Canadian Association of University Teachers
Acadia University Faculty Association
Algoma University Faculty Association
Athabasca University Faculty Association
Association of Professors of Bishop's University
Brock University Faculty Association
Cape Breton University Faculty Association
Carleton University Academic Staff Association
Concordia University Faculty Association
Federation of Post-Secondary Educators of BC
Laurentian University Faculty Association
University of Manitoba Faculty Association
McMaster University Academic Librarians' Association
Memorial University of Newfoundland Faculty Association
Mount Allison Faculty Association
Mount Saint Vincent University Faculty Association
Northern Ontario School of Medicine Faculty Association
University of Prince Edward Island Faculty Association
Queen's University Faculty Association
Saint Mary's University Faculty Union
University of Saskatchewan Faculty Association
Faculty Association of the University of St. Thomas
Trent University Faculty Association
Windsor University Faculty Association
University of Winnipeg Faculty Association
York University Faculty Association
Canadian Federation of Nurses Unions
United Nurses of Alberta
Saskatchewan Union of Nurses
Manitoba Nurses' Union
Ontario Nurses' Association
New Brunswick Nurses Union
Nova Scotia Nurses' Union
Prince Edward Island Nurses' Union
Newfoundland and Labrador Nurses' Union
Ontario English Catholic Teachers' Association
Ontario Secondary School Teachers' Federation
The Professional Institute of the Public Service of Canada
Public Service Alliance of Canada

International 
Air Line Pilots Association, International
Amalgamated Transit Union
American Federation of Musicians
Bakery, Confectionery, Tobacco Workers and Grain Millers' International Union
CWA-Canadian Media Guild
Glass, Molders, Pottery, Plastics and Allied Workers International Union (external website)
International Alliance of Theatrical Stage Employees, Moving Picture Technicians, Artists and Allied Crafts of the United States, its Territories and Canada
International Association of Bridge, Structural, Ornamental and Reinforcing Iron Workers
International Association of Fire Fighters
International Association of Heat and Frost Insulators and Asbestos Workers
International Association of Machinists and Aerospace Workers
International Association of Sheet Metal, Air, Rail and Transportation Workers
International Brotherhood of Electrical Workers
International Brotherhood of Boilermakers, Iron Ship Builders, Blacksmiths, Forgers and Helpers
International Federation of Professional and Technical Engineers
International Longshore and Warehouse Union
International Longshoremen's Association
International Plate Printers, Die Stampers and Engravers' Union of North America
International Union of Bricklayers and Allied Craftworkers
International Union of Operating Engineers
International Union of Painters and Allied Trades
Operative Plasterers' and Cement Masons' International Association
Seafarers' International Union of Canada
Service Employees International Union
Workers United Canada Council
Teamsters Canada
United Auto Workers
United Brotherhood of Carpenters and Joiners of America
United Food and Commercial Workers Union
United Mine Workers of America
United Steelworkers
United Association of Journeymen and Apprentices of the Plumbing and Pipe Fitting Industry
UNITE HERE

See also 

 List of unions affiliated with the AFL-CIO
 Global list of trade unions
 List of trade unions in Quebec
 List of trade unions in Canada

References
 Canadian Labour Congress Affiliated Unions

Canadian Labour Congress
Lists of organizations based in Canada
Canada